Fireproof is an album by the American singer-songwriter Dawn Landes. The album was released in January 2008 in Europe on Fargo Records, and March 4, 2008, in the United States on Cooking Vinyl Records.

The song "You Alone" was featured in the 2005 film Winter Passing.

Track listing

References

2008 albums
Cooking Vinyl albums